Neptunes WPSC is a water polo and swimming club, founded in 1929, based in Balluta Bay, Saint Julian's, Malta.

Water polo
Neptunes WPSC won 26 summer leagues and 21 winter leagues.  Neptunes WPSC have had many great foreigners, such as Vladimir Vujasinović, Tamás Molnár, Leonardo Sottani, etc. Besides getting great players the club has been able to 'make' its own legends such as Stevie Camilleri joined VK Partizan on a six-month loan deal in 2007 after being suggested to the club officials by Vladimir Vujasinović and now is playing for RN Bogliasco and Niki Lanzon (current captain). The club has other very promising youngsters like, Benji Lanzon, Kyle De Battista, Gabriel Pace, Zack Mizzi and Jordan Camileri who is Stevie Camilleri's younger brother.

Neptunes WPSC current squad:
[Alan Borg Cole]
 Ryan Galea
Andrea Sammut
Michele Stellini
Timmy Agius
Aleksandar Ćirić
Stevie Camilleri
Jordan Camilleri 
Gabriel Pace
Kai Bcp 
Tamás Molnár
Maxeline Barbara Farrugia 

Coach: Sergey Markoch
Assistant coach: Ian Azzopardi
Club doctor: Dr. Stefan Camilleri
Club President: Matthew Bonello

Besides being on the forefront of the premier league Neptunes WPSC has a very successful youth academy:

Under 13:

The U/13 was reintroduced to Malta by the "ASA Malta" in 2012 led by coach "Joseph 'Guzi L-Ors' Attard" who besides having a remarkable career as a player is also having a very successful career as coach was able to lead the team to success.
'Guzi' is supported by "Monique Mangion" who helps coach the team in swimming.

Under 15:

Led by coach "Joseph 'Guzi L-Ors' Attard" who besides having a remarkable career as a player is also having a very successful career as coach leading the U/14 and U/15 team to success for the last four years.

Under 17:

Led by coach "Ian Azzopardi" was able to win the U/16 team league in 2011 in his first year coaching for the club but was not able to win in 2012.

Under 20:

Also led by coach "Ian Azzopardi" which has been unable to win a league in the last two years.

Swimming
Besides being a successful water polo club Neptunes WPSC also has a formidable swimming team.

The swimming team is split up into different sections but the main competing squads are the Top Squad led by coach "Gail Rizzo" and the "Junior Squad" led by coach "Keith 'Cokita' Bartolo". The two coaches are also supported by "Monique Mangion".

The club makes its pools available (at a price of course) to a swimming school. The pools are dominated all day by the instructors and students.
It is also true to note, that many people have complained of infections after swimming in these pools. This is probably due to their overpopulation and excessive use. In fact, it is also a pity that this club has now degenerated into a lido. The same problem has been encountered with the children's pool, additional problems here were rough playing by 12- to 20-year-olds while small children were swimming there. This rough playing includes the throwing of hard water polo balls from one end of this children's pool to the other. Water polo balls also end up in this pool from the adults' (big) pool, despite a temporary preventive net being set up. These balls also end up on a sunbather occasionally!

History

1929 to 1949 
Neptunes’ glorious history all but started in 1929 when a certain Alfred Gauci, then popularly known as Is-sur Fred, formed a strong water polo team from the many youngsters who used to meet and swim regularly at Balluta Bay.
A wooden hut was erected and this served as the club house. On Gauci's suggestion the club was to be called Neptunes as Neptune (Neptunus) was the god of the Sea.

The game of water polo had already been in existence in Malta when Neptunes were formed. The Amateur Swimming Association was founded in 1925.

Our first competitive game was in 1931, in the second division against Vittoriosa at the Sliema Pitch. This used to be laid out on one side of the chalet.

Prior to this, however, Neptunes were making a name for themselves with the positive results they were obtaining when playing against teams from visiting warships. These included HMS Walrus, HMS Sussex, HMS Viscount and HMS Codrington.

Teams from the British Fleet were being freely challenged and Neptunes had suddenly become the envy of all other previously established clubs.

In 1944 Neptunes held several encounters against Services teams among which the most conspicuous was one nicknamed il-Palestinjani who had a really strong team.

The members of Neptunes’ first side, way back in 1929, were Joe Demarco, John Chetcuti, Frank Bardon, Franz Mattei, Gerry Degiorgio, Jerry Calleja Gera and Joe Albanese.

Franz Wismayer, Jimmy Chetcuti and the Podestà brothers, Wilfred and Arthur, the latter known as Babsie, gradually made the grade and were drafted in to support the squad.

In 1933 Neptunes, who in previous years were being denied participation among the ‘elite’, this time found themselves playing in the top sphere as all clubs were grouped in one division.

Matches were played alternately at the Neptunes and St Julian's pitches. Neptunes and Sliema finished on equal points. Without any previous notice, the association decreed that a ‘decider’ was to be played that same day which was a stormy October Sunday afternoon.

The Neptunes players were taken by surprise but still faced the strong Sliema team and beat them. This was Neptunes’ first game against Sliema United and their first ever success. They continued on this vein by winning the knock-out competition as well and so Neptunes confirmed their true force which broke Sliema's long-standing monopoly.

Here started the bitter sporting rivalry between Sliema and Neptunes which exists till this very day. Suddenly the club was mobbed by youngsters who wanted to form part of the team.

The Neptunes tree flourished with players by the name of Eggie Xuereb (whose son Martin was our goalkeeper in early seventies), Joe (Dormi) and Teddy Gatt (Teddy's son Edward also had a say in the club's successes), Marcel Bianchi, Alfred Lanzon (grandfather of Niki and Kayne), Wilfred Gatt, Alex Mizzi and others.

The Maltese national water polo team that took part in the 1936 Olympic Games in Berlin included six players from the Neptunes’ side. These were Franz Wismayer, Jimmy Chetcuti, Joe Albanese, Wilfred and Babsie Podestà and Alfred Lanzon. Efforts to stage the 1936 championship officially on the national team's return from Berlin proved futile, as other clubs did not relish facing Neptunes with the aforementioned Olympians in their side. In the 1930s, Neptunes won the league championship on the four occasions they took part in. That was in 1933, 1934, 1937 and 1938. They also won the first championship organised after the war in 1945. So one can freely claim that Neptunes won five consecutive first division league titles!

Neptunes failed to take part in the ASA league in 1935 and 1939 for various reasons. In 1935 Neptunes took exception to remarks passed by a referee that Neptunes would never win the league championship again until he was in charge. The club withdrew from all competitions as a protest.

Then in 1939 the war tension seemed to have affected the water polo circles and in keeping with the uneasy atmosphere Neptunes withdrew from the competitions after a squabble over the alleged transfer of Walter Naudi to Sliema, with our club claiming that Walter was still a Neptunes player.

War broke out in September 1939 and official competitions resumed in 1945. After winning the 1945 and 1949 leagues and the 1947 and 1949 KO competitions, Neptunes were to face a ten-year barren spell as we could find no youngsters who could replace the ageing veteran stars.

1950 to 1959 
This ten-year period under review must rank as the worst in the club's history.

There were times when fears of a closedown were becoming a reality. But sheer determination by three club stalwarts, Angelo DeBono, Stanley Ellul Mercer and Loris Manché, ensured that Neptunes regained its rightful place among the top water polo clubs on the island.

Support in no small measure also came from several other faithful club members, such as the Floridias, Degiorgio Lowes, Nanny Cachia, Wismayers, Albanese, all household names at Neptunes.

Long-serving secretary Stanley Ellul Mercer was instrumental in revitalising Neptunes by infusing amongst the members that much-needed spirit which was at that time waning.

The retirement of most of the players who had played as long as they could since the foundation of the club, left a huge vacuum and the club struggled to put up a competitive team.

The club spirit, however, always prevailed and the exercise of renewal was a natural consequence. The team foundations were being laid on a new crop. This included, among others, the indefatigable Wilfred Mamo, Edward Xuereb, Tancred Gouder, Victor Cachia, Donald and Bertie Agius, goalkeepers Jimmy Micallef Eynaud and Tony Gialanze and his brother Michael.

The kingpins during these years, however, were Loris Manché, Jimmy Platts and Bertie Portelli who all remained with the club even when Neptunes were relegated.

Having been in the fray prior to the introduction of their younger colleagues, Portelli, Mamo and Micallef Eynaud ushered Neptunes to a new era which was soon to blossom. As the Sixties approached the outlook for our team looked bright. It was only a matter of blending the up-and-coming talent into a really competitive outfit capable of putting the club back on the honours map.

Meanwhile, Mamo was selected to represent Malta in swimming events at the Cardiff Commonwealth Games in 1958. Bertie Portelli, too, was selected but he had to withdraw at the eleventh hour due to other important commitments.

1960 to 1969 
Through the unstinted efforts of Angelo Debono, Loris Manché and Stanley Ellul Mercer, ably aided by newcomers to the club administration such as Wilf Mamo and Jimmy Micallef Eynaud who were both still on the playing staff, Tony Coleiro (even he put up an occasional appearance in the sides), George Sclivagnotis and others, Neptunes were becoming more organised.

The concept of having someone in charge of the playing squads was at last becoming ‘acceptable’ and was considered a must.

Year in year out members of the ‘old brigade’ were given the onus of conducting the pre-season land training, which, unfortunately, was attended by a very small number of players.

Enthusiastic but very raw youngsters, unaware of the rigours the water polo game entailed, did not take long to call it a day.

Franz Wismayer, Joe Albanese and John Degiorgio all carried out, over the years, circuit training in an effort to bring the players in shape for the impending season.

However, the dynamic Angelo Debono was adamant that Neptunes returned to winning silverware as the fare being offered by the up-and coming youngsters gave a clear indication that success for the club was not far away.

Members were convinced that our team possessed good players but somehow the ultimate prize was eluding us. With Joseph Wismayer and Tony Albanese entering the scene at a relatively very young age, the Neptunes team started having a sounder look.

In 1964 our president decided to sign on Freddie Portelli, then a teenager, from Sirens. Portelli was at that time gathering fame when he formed part of one of the most popular musical groups at the time “The Black Train”. Later he became recognised as Malta's top Rock Star.

A ‘toddler’ by the name of Joe Chetcuti, who eventually proved to be a fast swimmer and a sharp-shooter established himself in the side.

Neptunes had not won the first division championship for fourteen years! The League campaign had started drearily for us with two consecutive 1-0 defeats to Sliema and Valletta. The turning point came when Dr Manché offered his services as coach. Through his perseverance, discipline and his knowledge of the game, we totted eight victories all in a row, which gave us the ultimate prize after so many years in the wilderness. We also went on to win the Cup.

The Neptunes team was being consolidated and UK Services personnel were engaged regularly to bring the players in shape.

The water polo community was rocked in 1968 when Neptunes announced they had engaged the services of one of the best all-round water polo players Malta had ever produced, Freddie Griscti.

This signing from neighbours Balluta strengthened Neptunes immeasurably. The 1967 Kitty Kola Cup final between Neptunes and Sirens had ended in a draw.

Due to the lateness in the season the replay was due to be played prior to the start of season 1968. But Sirens maintained that Griscti could not take part as in 1967 he was not on Neptunes’ books.

The ASA snubbed Sirens’ protests and so Neptunes were declared winners.

The end of the Sixties saw Neptunes win their fourth Double in 1969.

Griscti and Chetcuti had combined to mould our side into a formidable one.

Paul Cachia, however, will long remember the penultimate league match against Balluta, for his brilliant goal four seconds from time that set seal on the league championship.

An earlier save by our goalkeeper Paul Falzon from a penalty throw in this match also contributed to our triumph.

The usually solid Bertie Portelli, Ian Camilleri and Joseph Wismayer were the other ‘regulars’ that season.

Charitable work

The team organised a fund raising activity to help the severely disabled people in Malta.  People who benefited from this activity include Bekii Azzoppardi and Maresca Demanuele.

External links
 

Water polo clubs in Malta
Swimming in Malta
St. Julian's, Malta
Sports clubs established in 1929
1929 establishments in Europe